Bozhidar Mitrev (born 31 March 1987 in Sofia) is a Bulgarian retired professional footballer who played as a goalkeeper.

Mitrev began his career at Levski Sofia. In early 2013 he moved to Lokomotiv Sofia, where he made more than 60 league appearances, before moving to Moldovan National Division club Sheriff Tiraspol in 2015. In early 2017 Mitrev re-signed for Levski.

Career

Levski Sofia
Mitrev came through the youth ranks at Levski Sofia. For 2006–07 season he was promoted to the first squad as third choice behind Georgi Petkov and Nikolay Mihaylov. He made his debut in a 3–0 home loss against Werder Bremen in the group stage of the Champions League on 31 October 2006, replacing Nikolay Mihaylov at half-time. On 4 November, he started for first time, keeping a clean sheet in a 3–0 home league win over Beroe Stara Zagora. On 5 December, Mitrev played in Levski's 2–0 defeat to Chelsea at Stamford Bridge, making several excellent saves, including one reaction save from a Michael Essien header. However, he received criticism from the Chelsea faithful for a bad challenge on Didier Drogba, clearly fouling him. Chelsea were not offered a penalty, however Drogba accepted the apologies of the goalkeeper. Mitrev collected his first A Group title winner's medal at the end of the 2006–07 season, playing 12 matches in all competitions.

On 10 March 2009, Mitrev scored 90-meters goal for the second team of Levski in a game against Vihren Sandanski. On 9 May 2009, he kept a clean sheet in a 2–0 win in the Eternal derby of Bulgarian football against CSKA Sofia. Mitrev finished the season with 7 appearances in the league, as Levski clinched the A Group.

On 17 December 2009, Mitrev played in a 1–0 Europa League away win over Lazio at Stadio Olimpico.

Mitrev left Levski on 1 July 2012 after his contract with the club expired. He spent six seasons of his career with Levski, mainly as a backup. He played 52 competitive games in all competitions.

Lokomotiv Sofia
After six months without a club, Mitrev joined Lokomotiv Sofia on 28 December 2012. He made his debut in a 2–0 away loss against Lokomotiv Plovdiv on 2 March 2013. Mitrev left the team from the Nadezhda district after the 2014/2015 A PFG season when it was administratively relegated to the V group, as it was unable to obtain a license for professional football due to failing to meet the deadlines to pay for or provide sufficient guarantees regarding its debts.

Sheriff Tiraspol
In June 2015, Mitrev moved abroad for the first time, joining Moldovan club Sheriff Tiraspol.

Return to Levski
In March 2017, Mitrev was signed by Levski urgently since the starter Bojan Jorgacevic will be unavailable for the rest of the season due to a shoulder injury and the other two goalkeepers being too young and inexperienced. Mitrev signed for 1,5 years. At the beginning of 2017–18 season, he was appointed as the captain of the team.

Voluntari
On 27 February 2019, Mitrev signed with Romanian club FC Voluntari until the end of the season with an option for extension.

International career
On 7 February 2015, Mitrev made his first appearance for Bulgaria, in the 0–0 draw with Romania in a non-official friendly match, playing the first 45 minutes. He earned his first cap on 8 June 2015, in the 0:4 loss against Turkey in another exhibition game, being between the sticks for the entire duration of the match. His official debut followed a few days after, keeping a clean sheet the whole match in a 0–1 away win against Malta, for the Euro 2016 qualifiers.

Career statistics

Honours
 Levski Sofia
 A Group (2): 2006–07, 2008–09
 Bulgarian Cup: 2006–07
 Bulgarian Supercup (2): 2007, 2009

 Sheriff Tiraspol
 Moldovan National Division: 2015–16
 Moldovan Super Cup: 2016

 Individual
Best goalkeeper in the Bulgarian First League - 2017.

References

External links
 Profile at Levskisofia.info

1987 births
Living people
Footballers from Sofia
Bulgarian footballers
Association football goalkeepers
Bulgaria international footballers
First Professional Football League (Bulgaria) players
Moldovan Super Liga players
Liga I players
PFC Levski Sofia players
FC Lokomotiv 1929 Sofia players
FC Sheriff Tiraspol players
FC Voluntari players
Bulgarian expatriate footballers
Expatriate footballers in Moldova
Bulgarian expatriate sportspeople in Moldova
Expatriate footballers in Romania
Bulgarian expatriate sportspeople in Romania